TD Centre is an office building home to the Toronto-Dominion Bank (TD Bank) in downtown Halifax, Nova Scotia, Canada. The complex was completed in 1974 and substantially reconstructed in 2014. 

The TD Centre originally stood at 73 metres with 18 floors.  Its 2014 expansion added 10 metres to the building's overall height and three additional floors of office space.  The building is adjacent to the CIBC Building to which it is connected through the Downtown Halifax Link system. On its remaining sides it is bounded by Barrington Street on the west, George Street on the south and Granville Street on its lowest, eastern side.

In 2010, TDB Halifax Holdings Limited announced its intention to enlarge the structure on its east side and to make substantial modifications to the roof (including an increase in height of 10 metres).

The project, which entailed stripping the building to its original concrete frame while it continued under occupancy, was designed by Lydon Lynch Architects. It incorporates the facade of an historic 19th century building, originally home to a leather harness maker, on its Granville Street level.

Construction began in November 2012 with the expanded structure topping out in late 2014. In July 2013, building owner TDB Halifax Holdings announced it had signed a new 10-year lease with TD Bank Group to continue as the building's anchor tenant.

The Building incorporates photovoltaic sun-shades on the south facade and on the street level sidewalk canopies. Photovoltaic cells have been laminated between sheets of glass to form a shade device that generates electricity while it is acts as a shade and reduces glare for computer screens.

See also
 List of tallest buildings in the Halifax Regional Municipality
 List of buildings in the Halifax Regional Municipality

Notes

External links
 TD Centre
 Emporis

Buildings and structures in Halifax, Nova Scotia
Bank buildings in Canada
Toronto-Dominion Bank